Zdeněk Němec (3 February 1933 – 29 January 2014) was a Czech athlete. He competed in the men's discus throw at the 1960 Summer Olympics. He was a husband of Jiřina Němcová, a Czechoslovak athlete. Their daughter is Eva Horáková, a basketball player.

References

External links
 

1933 births
2014 deaths
Athletes (track and field) at the 1960 Summer Olympics
Czech male discus throwers
Olympic athletes of Czechoslovakia
People from Zábřeh
Sportspeople from the Olomouc Region